This Is a Long Drive for Someone with Nothing to Think About is the debut studio album by American rock band Modest Mouse, released on April 16, 1996 by Up Records. Many of the album's tracks focus on traveling by automobile and the loneliness associated with rural life.

Track listing

Vinyl edition

Personnel

Modest Mouse
Isaac Brock – guitar and vocals (drums on "Dog Paddle")
Jeremiah Green – drums (bass on "Dog Paddle")
Eric Judy – bass (guitar on "Dog Paddle")

Additional musicians
Steve Wold – slide guitar, mandolin, guitar, backup vocals
Brent Arnold – cello
Nicole Johnson – vocals on "Custom Concern", "She Ionizes & Atomizes", and "Head South"
Calvin Johnson – extra vocals on "Head South"

Other
Produced by Steve Wold
Engineered by Scott Swayze & Steve Wold
Photography by Isaac Brock

References

External links
This Is a Long Drive for Someone with Nothing to Think About lyrics at Interstate-8

Modest Mouse albums
1996 debut albums
Up Records albums